Ord River Hydro Power Station is a hydroelectric power station on the Ord River in Western Australia.

The power station was opened on 10 May 1996 and began generating power in April 1997, with four  turbines. It supplies electricity to the nearby Argyle Diamond Mine, and the towns of Kununurra and Wyndham.

References

External links 
Pacific Hydro page on Ord River Hydro

Energy infrastructure completed in 1997
Hydroelectric power stations in Western Australia
Ord River